Roads in Bosnia and Herzegovina are the most important traffic branch in Bosnia and Herzegovina and an important part of the European road network. Roads are built, maintained and supervised by companies run by the Federation of Bosnia and Herzegovina and the Republika Srpska.

Motorways 
The primary high-speed motorways are called autoceste or autoputevi/аутопутеви, public road specially built and intended exclusively for motor vehicle traffic, which is marked as a motorway with a prescribed traffic sign, has two physically separated lanes for traffic from opposite directions with at least two lanes and a lane for forced stopping of vehicles, without intersection with transverse roads and railways or tramways at the same level and in whose traffic it can be included or excluded only by a certain and specially built connecting public road to the appropriate lane of the motorway. They are marked with a special road sign, similar to the road sign depicting a motorway/autoroute/autobahn in other parts of Europe. Motorways in Bosnia and Herzegovina are defined by the Ministry of Traffic and Communications of Federation of Bosnia and Herzegovina and Ministry of Transport and Communications of Republika Srpska.

Motorways and sections

Motorway sections under construction

Planned motorway sections

Expressways 
Currently there is no expressways in use, but several are planned.

List of planned expressways:

See also 

 List of E-roads in Bosnia and Herzegovina

References

External links 

 JP Autoceste FBIH
 Autoputevi RS

 
Road transport in Bosnia and Herzegovina